The 2007 National Club Baseball Association (NCBA) World Series was played at City of Palms Park in Fort Myers, FL from May 24 to May 30. The eighth tournament's champion was the University of North Carolina.

This was the last NCBA World Series in which there was only one division of competition.  Beginning the next season, the NCBA split into Division I and Division II for their teams.

Format
The format is similar to the NCAA College World Series in that eight teams participate in two four-team double elimination brackets with the only difference being that in the NCBA, there is only one game that decides the national championship rather than a best-of-3 like the NCAA.

Participants

Results

Bracket

Game Results

Championship Game

References

2007 in baseball
National Club Baseball Association
Baseball competitions in Fort Myers, Florida
2007 in sports in Florida